David Heath may refer to:
 David Heath (politician) (born 1954), British Liberal Democrat politician
 David Heath (radical) (1827/8–1880), British Chartist and radical politician
 David Heath (fighter) (born 1976), American mixed martial artist
 David Heath (cricket administrator) (1931–1994), cricketer
 David Heath (journalist) (born 1959), American journalist
 David Heath (probabilist) (1943–2011), American probabilist
 Gangrel (wrestler) (David William Heath, born 1969), American professional wrestler
 Dave Heath, American documentary and humanist photographer